Mandhata, also called Shivapuri or Mahismati, Capital  of Awanti Mahajanpad Omkareshwar, is a riverine island in the Narmada river  in Khandwa district, Madhya Pradesh, India. Omkareshwar Jyotirlinga is situated on the southern part of the island. Omkareshwar Mandhata is located on the Mandhata hill on the banks of the Narmada.

The name "Omkareshwar" is due to the shape of the island, which appears to be Om. Local tradition reveals that King Mandhata paid homage to Shiva here and made this holy place his capital.

This place is situated at a distance of about 10 km from Omkareshwar Road railway station on Akola–Ratlam rail line.

References 

Narmada River
River islands of India
Khandwa district
Landforms of Madhya Pradesh
Villages in Khandwa district